The  is an electric multiple unit (EMU) train type operated by the private railway operator Keio Corporation on commuter services in the Tokyo area of Japan since 1992.

Technical details

 MT ratio
 0 subseries: 10-car set: 6M4T (six motor cars and four trailer cars; each motor car has four motors)
 20 subseries: eight-car set: 4M4T
 Motor output: 
 Gear ratio: 6.07
 Drive mechanism: Parallel cardan
 Traction control system: GTO-VVVF
 Headlights: Sealed beam
 Destination indicators: roller-blind or 3-color LED
 Passenger information displays: 3-color LED (4 per car)
 Seating arrangement (intermediate cars): 4-7-7-7-4 on longitudinal bench seats

Body
The body is stainless steel. The front is steel.

Driver's cab
"T" shape one handle master-controller system. Analog (formerly digital) speedometer. TNS (Train Navigation System).
 Acceleration: 4 notch
 Deceleration: 7 notch + emergency

Formations
, the fleet consists of 14 ten-car sets and 13 eight-car sets (244 vehicles in total), formed as follows.
 c=Driver's cab; T=trailer, M=motor

0-subseries ten-car sets

20-subseries eight-car sets

Interior

History
The first 8000 series trains were introduced in 1992.

Six-car and four-cars sets (and occasionally a pair of four-car sets) used to be operated on splitting services which separated and re-joined at Takahatafudō Station until 2006. From 2013 to 2019, all six- and four-car 0-subseries sets underwent a refurbishment program. Among several technical upgrades, the cabs of the two inner ends were removed to form 10-car sets.

The 8000 series trains are used exclusively on Keio Corporation lines. Thus, unlike some other Keio trains, they do not continue past Shinjuku on to the Toei Shinjuku Line.

Set 8705F was involved on the October 2021 Tokyo attack.

Special liveries
Set 8713 received a special all-over green livery in September 2009 evoking the livery carried by the former 2000 series trains.

References 

Electric multiple units of Japan
8000 series
Train-related introductions in 1992
Nippon Sharyo multiple units
1500 V DC multiple units of Japan
Tokyu Car multiple units